is a Japanese voice actress and former member of the Japanese idol girl group AKB48. She is from Iwate. While with AKB48 she was a member of the subunit No Name. Her biggest role as a voice actress was as the title character Chitose Sakuraba in the anime series Chitose Get You!!.

Career
Nakaya passed AKB48's generation 3 audition on December 3, 2006. She is one of 20 girls who passed from among 12.828 candidates. She was first on stage at AKB48 Theater as part of Team B on April 8, 2007. On August 23, 2009, a reshuffle was announced and Nakaya was transferred to Team A.

On December 2, 2010, an audio book of Moshidora read by her received "Audio Book Award 2010". The audio book gets awarded based on consumer votes in FeBe! audio book website. She also provided voice in the anime series of Moshidora.

Along with fellow member from Team K Miku Tanabe, Nakaya formed a unit called Baby Gamba. The unit released a single DVD  under label Avex on September 14, 2011. Baby Gamba is a character in anime series Ganba no Bōken, a series based on kids book "Bōkentachi Gamba to 15-hiki no Nakama" by Otsuka Saito.

On December 13, 2011, her name was chosen along with 9 other members to voice characters in AKB48's original anime series AKB0048.

An autobiography of her, titled "Hisenbatsu Idol" was published in 2012. When she was a member, she was one of 4 AKB48's anime fan who is called "wota 4".

On Team K Waiting Stage on March 2, 2013 at night, Nakaya suddenly announces her departure as an AKB48 member to taking part in a voice acting audition. 4 days later at the same stage, she had her last and graduation concert as an AKB48 member. At the same time, she also quit from her former agency Mousa.

Filmography

Anime
Aikatsu Stars! as Haruka Ruka
AKB0048 as Orine Aida
AKB0048 Next Stage as Orine Aida
Chaos;Child as Hana Kazuki
Asako Get You!! as Chitose Sakuraba
Chitose Get You!! as Chitose Sakuraba
HappinessCharge PreCure! as Orina/Cure Wave
Idol Incidents as Ume Momoi
Kiznaiver as Ruru
Magical Somera-chan as Somera Nonomoto
Momokuri as Yuzuki Shimada
Moshidora as Ayano Hōjō
Tales of the Abyss as maid 1 (episode 1)
The Idolm@ster as boy (episode 1)
The Lost Village as girl (episode 6); Naana
The Magnificent Kotobuki as Kate
Triage X as Kaname Makishi

Video games

Atelier Sophie as Tess Heitzmann
Chaos;Child as Hana Kazuki
Chōginga Sendan as Yuki Katsumura
Himedatsu! Demon Saga as Charles
Hyperdimension Neptunia Mk2 as Mina Nishizawa
Idol Jihen as Shion Kagaya
Moeru Mahjong Moejan! as Ayumu Honrō
Thousand Memories as Hanabishi no An'yakusha Isabel
Uchi no Himesama ga Ichiban Kawaii as Condemned Princess Gabriella

Narration

Harapeko Yamagami-kun
Zenryoku Ōen! NHK-hai Figure 2012 navigator

Discography

Singles with AKB48

Collaborations and character songs

References

External links
 
 
 
 Sayaka Nakaya at Oricon 

1991 births
Living people
Japanese voice actresses
Japanese women pop singers
AKB48 members
21st-century Japanese women singers
21st-century Japanese singers
21st-century Japanese actresses